River Plate took part in the Uruguayan Primera División, qualifying for 2020 Copa Sudamericana as Uruguay-3rd. At the same time, it has participated in 2019 Copa Sudamericana.

Transfer Window

Summer 2019

In

Out

Winter 2019

In

Out

Squad

First team squad

Top Scorers 

Last updated on Dec 6, 2019

Disciplinary Record 

Last updated on Dec 6, 2019

Primera División

Apertura 2019

League table

Results by round

Matches 

note: Schedule was suspended (on April 28th) due to an aggression which took place against the Uruguayan Referee Association (AUDAF, in Spanish) .

Intermedio 2019

Group table

Results by round

Matches

Final

Clausura 2019

League table

Results by round

Matches 

note: Schedule was suspended (on September 27th) due to the death of youth player Agustín Martínez .

note: Schedule was suspended (on December 1st) due to an aggression against the AUDAF president Marcelo De León .

Overall

League table

2019 Copa Sudamericana

First stage 

Tied 1–1 on aggregate, River Plate won on away goals and advanced to the second stage.

Second stage

Colón advances to the round of 16 (Match E).

References

River Plate Montevideo seasons
River Plate